Recto Verso is the second studio album by French singer Zaz, released on 10 May 2013 by Play On, Jo & Co and Parlophone. It peaked at number two on the French Album Chart and spawned three singles, "On ira", "Si" and "Gamine". Musically, it is largely in a similar style to Zaz's eponymou début album. The title refers to the two sides of Zaz's personality, which she wished to express in the music of the album.

Commercial performance
The album was released to iTunes two days in advance of its physical release, which led to it entering the chart at number 35 on the week ending 16 May 2013. The following week, it rose to number two, with total sales of 44,500. The album lost in a well-publicized chart battle to Vanessa Paradis' album Love Songs, which charted at number one with sales of 48,900. The initial performance of Recto Verso was considered disappointing following Zaz, which spent eight weeks at number one. However, Recto Verso went on to spend 10 weeks in the top 10 and was certified Diamond by the Syndicat National de l'Édition Phonographique (SNEP) on 16 July 2014, denoting sales in excess of 500,000 copies in France.

Singles
The first single released from the album was "On ira" (English: "We Will Go"), an uptempo song about the joys of being human. Released to iTunes on 11 March 2013, the song débuted on the French Singles Chart at number 111 during the week ending 23 March 2013. It slowly climbed the charts, peaking at number 12 on 25 May 2013. It became her highest-charting single to date and first top 20. It was similarly successful in multiple other European countries, including Germany, Switzerland and Austria, where it was her first single to chart since "Je veux" in 2010.

The second single from the album was initially chosen to be "Comme ci, comme ça" and in September 2013, a music video for the song was released. However, the choice was changed to "Si" in October 2013 and a music video for that song was released in the same month, accompanied by a digital release on iTunes. On 20 October 2013, the song reached number 34 on the French Singles Chart, tying with "Je veux" as Zaz's second highest-peaking single.

Track listing

Charts

Weekly charts

Year-end charts

Certifications

Notes

References

2013 albums
Parlophone albums
Zaz (singer) albums